Byšičky is a village and administrative part of Lysá nad Labem in Nymburk District in the Central Bohemian Region of the Czech Republic. It has about 100 inhabitants. It has a round village green, with a tiny chapel surrounded by four large linden trees in the centre.

References

Populated places in Nymburk District
Neighbourhoods in the Czech Republic